Several popes are regarded by historians as illiterate, including:
 Pope Zephyrinus (199–217); St. Hippolytus of Rome wrote "Pope Zephyrinus was illiterate" (Hippol. p. 284, ed. Miller).
 Pope Adrian IV (1154–1159); George Washington Dean writes: "Adrian IV., the only English Pope, had been an illiterate servant in a monastery at Avignon."
 Pope Celestine V (1294); Sir Maxwell Herbert writes of Celestine V: "On the commemoration day of S. Paul, Celestinus the Fifth was created Pope, who, albeit illiterate, was the priest and confessor of his predecessor."

Wrongly regarded as illiterate
Ludwig von Pastor has shown that Pope Julius II (1503–1513) was not illiterate, although he is poetically referred to as such by Desiderius Erasmus.

Notes

History of the papacy
Literacy
Lists of Catholic popes